The Sheriffs Are Coming is a British television fly on the wall documentary series, broadcast on BBC One, that follows the work of High Court Enforcement Officers (HCEOs) from Frank G Whitworth, High Court Enforcement. The initial idea for the series came after a ten-minute feature on HCEOs on the BBC One show Inside Out South West in 2011. The first series, containing ten episodes, commenced on 19 March 2012 and nine Series have been broadcast to date. As well as eight daytime series, six hour-long prime time series have been broadcast, compiling footage from episodes from the parent series. On 5 February 2014, The Sheriffs Are Coming was announced as the winner of the Best Daytime Programme at the Broadcast Awards 2014.

Basis
High Court enforcement officers (HCEOs) act under High Court writs and they operate within England and Wales. County Court judgements and awards with a value of £600 and above made in the County Court can be transferred to the High Court for enforcement for a court fee of £66. If enforcement is successful, the court fee is recoverable from the judgement debtor, along with the original debt, judgement interest and enforcement costs. If unsuccessful, all the claimant pays is a £75 plus VAT compliance stage fee (referred to as an admin fee in the programme). In the case of Employment Tribunal and Advisory, Conciliation and Arbitration Service (ACAS) awards, there is no minimum value before a claimant can use an HCEO.

HCEOs can enforce County Court judgements when the claimant has instructed them to transfer the judgement to the High Court making it a writ. Judgements can include Employment Tribunal awards, ACAS settlements and foreign judgements where the judgement debtor is based in England or Wales. Part 3 of the Tribunals, Courts and Enforcement Act 2007 was implemented in April 2014. The new regulations include a requirement to send a seven-day notice of enforcement to judgement debtors, an increase in the time delay between seizure and sale and how peaceable entry may be effected. There has also been reform of fees charged by HCEOs.

Broadcast
The first series began on 19 March 2012 with a team of Sheriffs from The Sheriffs Office, containing a total of ten episodes. A second series continuing with a team from The Sheriffs Office, contained fifteen episodes which aired daily (on weekdays) from 14 January to 1 February 2013 at 11:00am. Following their broadcast, each episode would be repeated the following morning at 7:00am on BBC Two. The first prime-time series broadcast during the Summer of 2013. A total of four episodes, containing highlights from the first and second series, broadcast at 7:00pm between 22 and 31 July, being shown on both Mondays and Wednesdays. The third series, again reducing to ten episodes, aired daily (on weekdays) from 13 to 24 January 2014. Once again, each episode would be repeated the following morning at 7:00am on BBC Two.

A second prime-time series followed in Summer 2014, containing highlights from Series 3. Again, four episodes broadcast at 7:00pm between 4 and 14 August, again being shown on Mondays and Wednesdays. A fourth series with The Sheriffs Office, containing just five episodes, the shortest of any series yet, aired daily between 16 and 20 March 2015. This was followed by the first series of the half-hour reversions, containing highlights from the first three series. These aired daily (on weekdays) from 23 March to 17 April 2015. A third prime-time series following in Summer 2015, containing highlights from Series 4. Three episodes broadcast weekly at 7:00pm on Wednesday evenings from 22 July 2015. The fifth series, again increasing to ten episodes and with a team of Sheriffs from The Sheriffs Office, aired daily from 11 to 24 April 2016. Again, each episode was repeated the following day at 6:45am on BBC Two.

The second series of half-hour reversions aired from 17 to 27 October 2016. The fourth prime-time series followed in January 2017, containing six episodes. These were broadcast weekly from 4 January to 8 February 2017, airing at 8:00pm on Wednesdays. The sixth series aired daily (on weekdays) from 3 to 14 April 2017, again at 11:00am. Again, each episode was repeated the next morning at 6:30am on BBC Two. The fifth prime-time series followed in July 2017, containing just three episodes. These were broadcast from 13 July to 23 August, again at 8:00pm on Wednesdays. The third series of half-hour reversions, containing highlights from the sixth series, aired daily (on weekdays) from 20 November to 1 December 2017. The seventh series, which commenced filming in October, aired on BBC One from 12 March 2018.

The ninth series aired with a new team of Enforcement Agents from Frank G Whitworth, High Court Enforcement who form part of Enforcement Bailiffs Ltd on 31 May 2021. Ten 45-minute episodes were shown on BBC One every weekday at 11:00am until the final episode of the series aired on Friday 11 June 2021.

Transmissions

Main series

Hour long reversions

Half hour reversions

Cast

Current cast
 Ben Dirom
 Grant Bailey-Rodriguez
 James King
 Luke Peacock
 Mark King
 Myles Whitworth

Former cast
 Lawrence Grix
 Kevin Kev McNally
 Tommy Coyle
 Gerald Anderson
 Robert Foster
 Jess Paton
 Jamie Wykes
 Mike Perkins
 Jon Farley
 Adam Crossley
 Tracey Lee
 Billy Evans
 Andrew "Andy" Joryeff
 Adrian "Ady" Long
 Dave Steele
 Craig Wild
 Ken Warby
 Alan Pennington
 Chris Pearson
 Marc Newton
 Tony Smith
 Daryll Oreton
 Mark Povey
 Pete Spencer
 Dave Crabtree
 Dave Woodcock
 Steve Hockborn

See also
 Can't Pay? We'll Take It Away!

References

External links
Sheriffs are Coming High Court Enforcement Officer & Bailiff Services | The Sheriffs are coming

The Sheriffs Are Coming (IMDB)

2012 British television series debuts
BBC television documentaries
Television shows set in London